Thornton-le-Beans is a village and civil parish in the Hambleton District of North Yorkshire, England.

It is in the Thornton's electoral ward for district elections and the District Councillor is Bob Baker. The population of this electoral ward taken at the 2011 Census was 1,852. The village is currently in the Thirsk and Malton Parliamentary constituency, whose incumbent is Kevin Hollinrake.

The village has one pub called The Crosby behind which there is a campsite. In 2007 the Pub won "Best Pub Grub" in the Flavours of Hambleton Awards. There is a Methodist Chapel at the east end of the village and a Chapel of Ease at the west end. The graveyard looks over the Vale of York. The author Bill Bryson famously stated in his book Notes From a Small Island that he wants to be buried in Thornton-le-Beans, due to the oddness of the name.

Etymology
The town's odd name is derived from the common place name 'Thornton', meaning a farm with thorn bushes. This farm had beans grown upon it. In 1534 it was called Thornton-in-Fabis, the Latin for Thornton-le-Beans.

See also
Thornton-le-Beans Chapel

References

Villages in North Yorkshire
Civil parishes in North Yorkshire
Hambleton District